Giovanni Carrara Jiménez (born March 4, 1968) is a Venezuelan former professional baseball pitcher. He played in Major League Baseball (MLB) for the Toronto Blue Jays, Cincinnati Reds, Colorado Rockies, Los Angeles Dodgers, and Seattle Mariners, and in Nippon Professional Baseball (NPB) for the Seibu Lions. He is currently the pitching coach for the Palm Beach Cardinals.

Career
Carrera initially struggled as a starting pitcher in the major leagues but later became an effective long reliever. He had a 90–92 MPH fastball, along with a couple of breaking balls, a deceptive slow curve, and particularly his off-speed pitch; a hard one that was somewhere between a slider and cut fastball. He controlled the running game as well, with a good move to both first base and second, and a quick delivery to the plate.

On August 15, 2001, Carrara combined with fellow Venezuelan pitchers Omar Daal, Kelvim Escobar, and Freddy García to win their respective starts: Carrara, of the Dodgers, facing Montreal, 13–1; Daal, in a Phillies victory over the Brewers, 8–6; Escobar, of the Blue Jays, over Oakland, 5–2, and García, of Seattle, against the Red Sox, 6–2. This marked the first time in major league history that four pitchers coming from Venezuela recorded a winning game in their respective starts on the same day.

On August 26, 2006, Carrara was designated for assignment by the Dodgers. He was called up in September 2006 when rosters expanded and used sparingly after re-joining the big league club. The Dodgers chose not to re-sign Carrara in the offseason.

On May 4, 2007, Carrara was signed by the Caffè Danesi Nettuno of Serie A1 in Italy. In 2008, he was 8–2 with a 2.35 ERA and 49 strikeouts.

See also
 List of Major League Baseball players from Venezuela

External links
, or Retrosheet, or Nettuno BBC
The ESPN Baseball Encyclopedia – Gary Gillette, Peter Gammons, Pete Palmer. Publisher: Sterling Publishing, 2005. Format: Paperback, 1824pp. 

1968 births
Living people
Águilas del Zulia players
Caffe Danesi Nettuno players
Cardenales de Lara players
Cincinnati Reds players
Colorado Rockies players
Colorado Springs Sky Sox players
Dunedin Blue Jays players
Indianapolis Indians players
Iowa Cubs players
Knoxville Smokies players
Las Vegas 51s players
Los Angeles Dodgers players
Major League Baseball pitchers
Major League Baseball players from Venezuela
Mexican League baseball pitchers
Minor league baseball coaches
Myrtle Beach Hurricanes players
Nippon Professional Baseball pitchers
People from Anzoátegui
Piratas de Campeche players
Rochester Red Wings players
Seattle Mariners players
Seibu Lions players
St. Catharines Blue Jays players
Syracuse Chiefs players
Tacoma Rainiers players
Toronto Blue Jays players
Venezuelan baseball coaches
Venezuelan expatriate baseball players in Canada
Venezuelan expatriate baseball players in Italy
Venezuelan expatriate baseball players in Japan
Venezuelan expatriate baseball players in Mexico
Venezuelan expatriate baseball players in the United States
Venezuelan people of Italian descent
World Baseball Classic players of Venezuela
2006 World Baseball Classic players